Statistics of the Swiss National League A in the 1994–95 football season.

Overview
It was contested by 12 teams, and Grasshopper Club Zürich won the championship.

First stage

Table

Results

Second stage

Championship group

Table

Results

Promotion/relegation group

Table

Results

Sources
 Switzerland 1994–95 at RSSSF
 Switzerland - List of Champions rsssf.com

Swiss Football League seasons
Swiss
1994–95 in Swiss football